Ogino is a Japanese surname. Notable people with the surname include:

Ogino Dokuon (1819–1895), Rinzai roshi remembered for his daring resistance to religious oppression directed toward Buddhists during the late Tokugawa period and Meiji period of Japan
Ogino Ginko (1851–1913), the first licensed and practicing woman physician of western medicine in Japan
Kyusaku Ogino (1882–1975), Japanese doctor specializing in obstetrics and gynecology
Makoto Ogino (born 1959), Japanese manga artist
Masaji Ogino (born 1970), Japanese volleyball national player
Tadahiro Ogino (born 1982), Nippon Professional Baseball for the Chiba Lotte Marines in Japan's Pacific League
Shuji Ogino (born 1968), Japanese molecular pathological epidemiologist
Yuka Ogino (born 1999), Japanese idol and singer
Chihiro Ogino, fictional protagonist of the popular 2001 Japanese anime movie Spirited Away

See also
Ogino Station (disambiguation)
Ogino Station (Toyama)

Japanese-language surnames